Mehrab Fatemi (Persian:  محراب فاطمی) (born 1975) is an Iranian strongman and powerlifter.

Strongman career
Mehrab participated five times in Iran's Strongest Man competition, and hold the record of most wins with 4 wins (1998, 2001, 2005–2006).

See also
Iran's Strongest Man
World Powerlifting Congress
World Strongman Cup Federation

References

External links
 گفتگو با مهراب فاطمی
 افشاگری محراب فاطمی و برادرش علیه مردان آهنین و فرامرز خودنگاه
 گفت و گو با برادران فاطمی
 گفت و گو با فاطمی ها

1975 births
Living people
Iranian strength athletes
Iranian powerlifters